Oleg Bryjak (27 October 1960 – 24 March 2015) was a Kazakhstani-German bass-baritone opera singer. Born in Jezkazgan, Kazakh SSR, into an ethnic Ukrainian family, he moved to Germany in 1991 to join the Badisches Staatstheater Karlsruhe. From 1996 until his death, he was a soloist with the Deutsche Oper am Rhein in Düsseldorf.

Bryjak had been a protodeacon in a Ukrainian Orthodox church in Krefeld.

Bryjak died on 24 March 2015 along with his colleague Maria Radner when Germanwings Flight 9525 was deliberately crashed by its co-pilot in Prads-Haute-Bléone, France, during their return from performances of Richard Wagner's Siegfried at the Gran Teatre del Liceu in Barcelona.

Notable recordings
Leoš Janáček: Káťa Kabanová – Karita Mattila (Katia), Bryjak (Dikoj), Chorus and Orquesta del Teatro Real; Jiří Bělohlávek (conductor), Robert Carsen (director). Recorded at Teatro Real, Madrid, December 2008. Fra Musica (Harmonia Mundi) FRA003 (DVD).

References

External links
 Obituary at The Independent
 Trauer um Wagner-Sänger / Oleg Bryjak und Maria Radner verunglückt Bayerischer Rundfunk, 25 March 2015 

1960 births
2015 deaths
German opera singers
Soviet male opera singers
Operatic bass-baritones
People murdered in France
German people murdered abroad
German murder victims
Mass murder victims
Members of Ukrainian Orthodox church bodies
People from Karaganda Region
Kazakhstani people of Ukrainian descent
German people of Kazakhstani descent
German people of Ukrainian descent
Soviet emigrants to Germany
Naturalized citizens of Germany
21st-century German male opera singers
20th-century German male opera singers
Victims of aviation accidents or incidents in France
Victims of aviation accidents or incidents in 2015